The AS-I is a highway in Asturias, Spain that connects Mieres and Gijón. It is also known as Autovía Minera because of its travel through the mining towns in Asturias like Mieres or Langreo, passing near La Camocha coal mine before finishing in Gijón.

The AS-I was made between 2000 and 2003 by the Government of the Principality of Asturias.

The last junctions opened were the Enlace de Ceares in Gijón, in 2007, and the one in Pola de Siero.

Route

References

Transport in Asturias
Autopistas and autovías in Spain